Making Lite of Myself is stand-up comedian John Pinette's second comedy album.

Track listing
"The Gym"  – 5:19
"Subway Diet"  – 1:03
"The Herbalist and the Blocked Colon"  – 3:40
"Low Carb Diets and Dr. Phil"  – 2:14
"Extreme Sports"  – 5:15
"Camping"  – 8:30
"Pennsylvania / Thanksgiving"  – 7:16
"England"  – 4:39
"France"  – 4:07
"Viva El Gordo"  – 4:45
"Get Outta the Line!"  – 4:18
"Toilet Paper"  – 1:10

References

John Pinette albums
2007 albums